K. G. Paulose is a Sanskrit scholar specialized in the dramaturgy of the Natya Shastra and Kooditaatam.

Early life
He was born in a Christian family in Puthan Kavu, Ernakulam district in the Indian state of Kerala. He studied in the Sanskrit pathasala and Sanskrit college under the guidance of scholars such as T. K. Ramachandra Iyer and Damodarapisharoty.

Career
His teaching career began in 1969 at Neelakanthasarma Sanskrit college Pattambi. he became principal in govt. Sanskrit college, Tripunithura in 1986. In 1987 he became the syndicate member of MG University. In 1996 he became the first registrar of Sree Sankara University of Sanskrit. In 2007 he became the first vice chancellor of Kerala Kerala Kalamandalam after it was deemed a university. Now he became editor in charge of the publication division of Arya Vaidya Sala, Kottakkal.

Personal life 
He married T. K. Sarala, with whom he raised Manu and Smrti.

Contributions

Books
Natamkusha- a critic of dramaturgy
Kootiyattam a historic study
Introduction to Kootiyattam
Bhagavadajjuka in Kootiyattam
Bheema in search of celestial flower- kalyanasaugandhika
Kootiyattam-(Malayalam translation)

Edited books and journals
Dheemahai- bilingual journal, Chinmaya international foundation
Aryavaidyan- 
Poornatrayi- journal of Sanskrit college, Tripunithura
Ravivarma Sanskrit Grandhavali, the publication division of govt. Sanskrit college tTipunithura
Subodhini- HH Rajarshi Ravivarma
 Narayaneeyam- with commentary of Sahityatilakan Ramapisharoti.
Balabodhanam
Vakyatatvam
Scientific heritage of India- Ayurveda
Scientific heritage of India- mathematics

Honours
'Vyangyavyakhya: The Aesthetics of Dhvani in Theatre 'for its prestigious award for the best book on art on 09-11-2014 - Keralakalamandalam Deemed University for Art and Culture
Eminent Sanskrit Scholar, on 12-11-2014-The Centre for Heritage Studies, Govt.of Kerala, Hill Palace Tripunithura
Vachaspati on 22-11-2014 - Anyonyam at Kadavalloor awarded the title of
Vachaspati in 2009 - Thirupati Sanskrit Viswavidyalaya

References

1946 births
Living people
Indian Sanskrit scholars
People from Kerala